Union Royale Sportive Lixhe Visé, commonly known as URSL Visé, is a Belgian football club based in Visé, Liège Province. The club play their home games at Stade de la Cité de l'Oie. The club colours, reflected in their crest and kits, are white, red and blue. Formed in 1927 as a merger between to local clubs, the club has spent most of its existence in the provincial tiers.

History
The club was formed on 22 October 1927 when two clubs not affiliated to the Royal Belgian Football Association (KBVB) (Bleus clairs and Bleus foncés) merged and continued under the name Union Sainte-Brigitte Football Club. On 21 November 1928, the club joined the KBVB.

On 6 August 1929, the name was changed to Union Sportive Lixhe. On 17 May 1945 the name was changed again: they would continue under the name Sporting Union Lixhe-Lanaye. On 5 November 1953, the club was given royal status and its name was changed to Union Royal Sports Lixhe-Lanaye on 26 November 1953.

For a long time, the club spent an anonymous existence in the regional tiers of the Liège Province. Until the 2013–14 season, where the club won four consecutive promotions – three championships and one play-offs win – to reach the Belgian Third Division.

After the bankruptcy of local rivals CS Visé in 2014, the club was relocated to the main stadium in Visé, the 5,460 capacity Stade de la Cité de l'Oie. In order to give this move more weight, the name was changed to Union Royale Sportive Lixhe Visé on 1 July 2016. In 2017, the club was promoted from the provincial series to the Belgian Third Division and finished second behind FC Tilleur, thereby promoting to the second amateur division. The following year, they again entered the play-offs for promotion, in which they beat Oudenaarde and Ronse, which secured their sixth promotion in a row. Thereby, URSL Visé would compete in the highest amateur division, the Belgian third-tier First Amateur Division for the first time in club history for the 2019–20 season.

In December 2019, the club managed to sign former Belgian international Jonathan Legear.

Honours 
Belgian Second Amateur Division:
Runners-up (1): 2018–19
Belgian Third Amateur Division:
Runners-up (1): 2017–18
Première Provinciale Liège:
Runners-up (1): 2016–17
Deuxième Provinciale Provinciale Liège:
Winners  (1): 2015–16
Troisième Provinciale Provinciale Liège:
Winners  (1): 2014–15
Quatrième Provinciale Provinciale Liège B:
Winners  (1): 2013–14

Current squad

References 

Association football clubs established in 1927
Football clubs in Belgium
1927 establishments in Belgium
URSL Visé
Visé